Čantavir is the largest village with Hungarian ethnic majority in the autonomous province of Vojvodina, Serbia. It is situated in the municipality of Subotica, North Bačka District. The village has a population of 6,951 inhabitants (as of 2011 census). The main occupation of the villagers is agriculture and stock breeding.

History

Historical population
 1921: 8,969
 1931: 11,287
 1948: 9,397
 1953: 9,262
 1961: 9,341
 1971: 9,085
 1981: 8,596
 1991: 7,940
 2002: 7,178
 2011: 6,951

School and culture
There is an elementary school in Čantavir.

This school have had a very famous children's choir conducted by Éva Gubena music teacher (she got the prize "Sparkle of Culture" in 2001).
In 1995, previous members of famous children's choir, (Bodor/ Huszár/ Melinda, Barkóci/ Juhász/ Szilvia, Pósa/ Faragó/ Gabriella, Sándor/ Pósa/ Csilla, Poljaković/ Zabos/ Marianna) started a ladies choir "Primavera" under conductor Éva Gubena. 

From 1996 "Primavera" became a mixed voice chamber choir "Musica Viva". They have tried to bring live music to the hearts of their audience at concerts, festivals and other events. On their programme there are numerous compositions from all areas of musical history.

People 
 József Törley (1858-1907), Hungarian business magnate, investor, philanthropist
 Szilveszter Matuska (1892–?), serial killer
 Heni Dér (born 1986), Hungarian singer

See also 
List of places in Serbia
List of cities, towns and villages in Vojvodina

References

Literature 
 Slobodan Ćurčić, Broj stanovnika Vojvodine, Novi Sad, 1996.

External links 

 Ordinary school website
 History of Čantavir 

Subotica
Places in Bačka
Populated places in Vojvodina
Hungarian communities in Serbia

—